Lycisca may refer to:
 Lycisca (wasp), a wasp genus in the family Pteromalidae
 Wolf-dog hybrid, a canid hybrid resulting from the mating of a wolf and a dog
 Valeria Messalina (c. 17/20 – 48), a Roman empress, the third wife of the Emperor Claudius